Tere Mere Beach Mein is a celebrity chat show hosted by Bollywood choreographer and director Farah Khan. It premiered on Star Plus from 23 August 2009 and aired on weekends at prime time. The show ended on 10 October 2009, after completing 13 episodes. The show was produced by Shah Rukh Khan under Red Chillies Idiot Box.

Format
Each episode of the show revolves around a theme. The celebrity guests invited are those who suit the theme. What sets the show apart is the last segment of the show, namely Main Hoon Na, which connects the celebrities to the common man. A common man related to the topic is also invited and given a chance to come and share his story. Some of the interesting themes have been ‘Ghar Ka beta’ featuring Bipasha Basu and Shilpa Shetty, who have been like sons to their parents. Others were like "Second Chance" featuring Shahid Kapoor and Genelia D'Souza and "Joru ka Ghulam" featuring Shahrukh Khan. The guests also receive donations for the charities they support and bring their personal belongings to be auctioned for charity.

Celebrity guests
The show featured some well-known celebrities like Priyanka Chopra, Shahrukh Khan, Kareena Kapoor, Asin Thottumkal, Deepika Padukone, Irfan Pathan, Yusuf Pathan, Vijender Singh, Shahid Kapoor and several others. The first episode had Salman Khan, who appeared with his mother Sushila Charak Khan, while the last episode featured Shahrukh Khan.

Impact
Iqbal Pasha reunited with his family after eight years after he appeared as an audience in the show where he shared his past of being lost from his parents and got identified and united through this show.

References

External links
 Tere Mere Beach Mein on STAR Plus website
 'Farah Khan's Blog' Blog Posts
 'Tere Mere Beach Mein' Blog Posts

2009 Indian television series debuts
StarPlus original programming
Indian television talk shows
2009 Indian television series endings
Red Chillies Idiot Box